Hridayam Oru Kshethram is a 1976 Indian Malayalam-language film, directed and produced by P. Subramaniam. The film stars Madhu, Srividya, Raghavan and KPAC Lalitha. It is a remake of the Tamil film Nenjil Or Aalayam. The film was released on 24 December 1976.

Plot

Cast 

Madhu as Dr. Ramesh
Srividya as Prema
Raghavan as Hari
KPAC Lalitha as Kamalakshi
Kedamangalam Sadanandan as Priest
Anandavally as Kalyanimma
Aranmula Ponnamma as Ramesh's mother
Baby Sumathi as Sumam
Bahadoor as Bada Balan Pilla
KPAC Sunny as Dr. Sunny
Kuthiravattam Pappu as Naanu
Treesa
Beatrice as Vanaja

Soundtrack 
The music was composed by G. Devarajan, with lyrics by Sreekumaran Thampi.

References

External links 
 

1970s Malayalam-language films
1976 films
Films directed by P. Subramaniam
Malayalam remakes of Tamil films